Larry Paul Hibbard (born 1945) is a  Republican member of the Kansas House of Representatives, representing the 13th district (Toronto in Woodson County) from 2013 to 2019.

He resigned from the House on July 13, 2019, due to health reasons.

References

External links
 Representative Larry Hibbard
 Votesmart
 Openstates
 Ballotpedia
 Follow the money
 Influence Explorer

Republican Party members of the Kansas House of Representatives
Living people
People from Woodson County, Kansas
1945 births
21st-century American politicians